Turzyn may refer to the following places:
Turzyn, Kuyavian-Pomeranian Voivodeship (north-central Poland)
Turzyn, Masovian Voivodeship (east-central Poland)
Turzyn, Silesian Voivodeship (south Poland)
Turzyn, Szczecin